The 2015 Mercedes-Benz Challenge will be the fifth season of the Mercedes-Benz Challenge. It will begin at Goiânia in March, and will end at Interlagos in December. In 2015 Mercedes-Benz Challenge will be integrated at Stock Car Brasil events.

Entry list
 CLA AMG Cup drivers compete utilising the Mercedes-Benz CLA AMG while C250 Cup drivers use the Mercedes-Benz C250.

References

External links
  

Mercedes-Benz Challenge
Mercedes-Benz Challenge seasons